Bartley Reservoir is a reservoir for drinking water in Birmingham, England, operated by Severn Trent Water.

It is known as the place where Bill Oddie did much of his early birdwatching, and features in his books (notably Bill Oddie's Gone Birding) and television programmes. His first ever published article, for the West Midland Bird Club's annual report, was about the birds of the reservoir. The reservoir is also home to Bartley Sailing Club.

History
Most of the land occupied by Bartley Reservoir was in the parish of Northfield, originally in Worcestershire. It was transferred to Warwickshire when Northfield became part of Birmingham in November 1911, and thus became part of the West Midlands county on the latter's creation in 1974.

However, the south-west end of the reservoir overlapped into the parish of Frankley, in Worcestershire (Hereford and Worcester, from 1974). In April 1995 part of Frankley (including the south-west part of Bartley Reservoir) was transferred to Birmingham and thus joined the rest of the reservoir in the West Midlands county.

Shortly after the completion of the Elan Valley Reservoirs in the early 1920s, it became apparent that more storage capacity would be required to maintain the daily supplies needed by Birmingham. The reservoir is close to the terminus of the Elan aqueduct and adjacent to Frankley Reservoir.

The contract for the construction of the reservoir was let by Birmingham Corporation Water Department in February 1925 to Edmund Nuttall, Sons and Co. Ltd., of Manchester, and the Francois Cementation Company undertook all cementation. It was completed in 1930.

The reservoir featured in a television programme in 1985, when Bill Oddie was interviewed there by Julian Pettifer for a 50-minute Nature Watch Special: Bill Oddie - Bird Watcher.

See also
Frankley Reservoir
Frankley Water Treatment Works

References

External links

Bartley Sailing Club

Drinking water reservoirs in England
Reservoirs in Birmingham, West Midlands